Otis Starkey House is a historic home located at Cape Vincent in Jefferson County, New York.  It was built about 1820 and is a two-story Federal style residence.  It has two sections: a two-story main section and a lower two-story rear wing.  Also on the property is a gabled carriage house.

It was listed on the National Register of Historic Places in 1985.

References

Houses on the National Register of Historic Places in New York (state)
Federal architecture in New York (state)
Houses completed in 1820
Houses in Jefferson County, New York
National Register of Historic Places in Jefferson County, New York